Mitra papalis, common name the Papal/Pontifical Mitre, is a species of sea snail, a marine gastropod mollusk in the family Mitridae, the miters.

Distribution
This marine species is present in India and in the western Indo-Pacific (China, Xisha Islands, Taiwan, Philippines, New Guinea, Fiji, New Caledonia and Guam).

Habitat
These sea snails live on coral reefs and under rocks, from the intertidal zone to a depth of about 30 m.
Rarely, specimens are known from tangle nets at around 600 ft. depth.

Description
The form of these large shells is similar to a Papal mitre (hence the common name). They are elongate to ovate, fusiform and smooth but without axial streaks on the surface. Sutural coronations are present. The aperture is moderately wide, smooth within. The shell surface is white, with small white nodules under sutures and with several rows of irregular bright red-orange or purplish blotches.

This species is quite similar to Mitra stictica, but its body form is longer, with more adpressed sutures and wider nodules.

References

Bibliography
 Alan G. Hinton - Guide to Shells of Papua New Guinea
 Alan G. Hinton - Shells of New Guinea & Central Pacific
 Arianna Fulvo and Roberto Nistri (2005). 350 coquillages du monde entier. Delachaux et Niestlé (Paris) : 256 p.
 Cernohorsky W.O. (1976). The Mitridae of the World. Part I. The subfamily Mitrinae. Indo-Pacific Mollusca. 3(17): 273-528
 F. Springsteen and F. M. Leobrera - Shells of the Philippines

Mitridae
Gastropods described in 1758
Taxa named by Carl Linnaeus